Leonilde Iotti, commonly known as Nilde Iotti (10 April 1920 – 4 December 1999) was an Italian politician, member of the Italian Communist Party (PCI). She was the first and only woman member of the PCI to become the president of the Chamber of Deputies, an office she held for three consecutive legislatures from 1979 to 1992, becoming the longest-serving post-war president of the Chamber.

Early life 
Nilde Iotti was born in Reggio Emilia in 1920; her father Egidio was a railroader and a socialist trade unionist, fired by the railway company on account of his political commitment. In 1934, her father died, but, thanks to a scholarship, she attended the Catholic University of Milan, graduating in literature in 1942. At the university, she had among her professors, Amintore Fanfani, the future Christian Democratic leader and Prime Minister. On 5 October 1942, Iotti became a member of the National Fascist Party (PNF) within the Federation of Female Fascists of Reggio Emilia, as the fascist membership was a necessary condition to becoming a teacher.

After Benito Mussolini's downfall in July 1943 and Pietro Badoglio's proclamation on September 8, which caused the beginning of the civil war, Iotti became interested in communist ideals and took part in the resistance movement against the Nazi German invaders during World War II.

Political career 

After the end of the war and the referendum against the Savoy Monarchy, in 1946, Iotti was elected member of the Constituent Assembly, within the Italian Communist Party (PCI). She was also one of the 75 members of the Committee entrusted with the drafting of the Italian Republican Constitution.

In the same year, Iotti started her relationship with the communist leader, Palmiro Togliatti, who was 27 years older than her, which lasted until his death in 1964. Their relationship, which was kept secret in the early years, became public knowledge in 1948, after an attempt on Togliatti's life, a few days after the general election. Their love was opposed by Italy's public opinion, including many communists, because Togliatti was already married to Rita Montagnana at the time. However, Togliatti forced his wife Rita and their son Aldo, who was mentally ill, to live in Moscow, so he could continue his relationship with Iotti. Together they asked for and obtained the adoption of an orphan girl, Marisa Malagoli, the younger sister of one of the six workers killed by Carabinieri on 9 January 1950, in Modena, during a workers' demonstration.

In April 1948, Iotti was re-elected with the PCI to the Chamber of Deputies, of which she was a member without interruption until 1999. In 1956, she became a member of the Central Committee of the Party and in 1962 of the National Direction. Re-elected to the Chamber in 1963, she was appointed to the Constitutional Affairs Commission, focusing her activity on the relevance of the female role in the world of work and family relationships. In the following years, her main commitment became the reform of civil rights, notably the right to divorce. She was particularly involved in the campaign for the 1974 divorce referendum.

After the 1979 Italian general election, thanks to the support of PCI's historic rival, Christian Democracy (DC), Iotti became President of the Chamber of Deputies, with 443 votes out of 615. She succeeded another communist, Pietro Ingrao. Iotti focused her first speech in front of the house on women's role in society as well as the fight against terrorism.

Iotti was popular and respected as a president, and was confirmed in the office for two more legislatures. In 1987, she was entrusted by President Francesco Cossiga with a mandate of potentially forming a government. She became the first communist and the first woman to have ever received an exploratory mandate to become Prime Minister of Italy; however, Iotti was not able to form a coalition.
 
In 1992, Iotti's name was put forward for the election for President of the Italian Republic.

Personal life 
She was an atheist.

Death 
She died in Rome on 4 December 1999 and she is buried in the Cimitero del Verano.

Electoral history

Notes 

1920 births
1999 deaths
20th-century Italian women politicians
Burials at Campo Verano
Candidates for President of Italy
Democratic Party of the Left politicians
Democrats of the Left politicians
Deputies of Legislature I of Italy
Deputies of Legislature II of Italy
Deputies of Legislature III of Italy
Deputies of Legislature IV of Italy
Deputies of Legislature V of Italy
Deputies of Legislature VI of Italy
Deputies of Legislature VII of Italy
Deputies of Legislature VIII of Italy
Deputies of Legislature IX of Italy
Deputies of Legislature X of Italy
Deputies of Legislature XI of Italy
Deputies of Legislature XII of Italy
Deputies of Legislature XIII of Italy
European integration pioneers
Members of the Constituent Assembly of Italy
Italian anti-fascists
Italian atheists
Italian Communist Party politicians
Italian resistance movement members
People from Reggio Emilia
Presidents of the Chamber of Deputies (Italy)
Politicians of Emilia-Romagna
Università Cattolica del Sacro Cuore alumni
Women legislative speakers
Women members of the Chamber of Deputies (Italy)